Delphinium parryi is a species of larkspur known by the common names San Bernardino larkspur and Parry's larkspur. This wildflower is native to Baja California and California from the San Francisco Bay Area south. It is found in chaparral and woodlands and other habitats.

Description
Delphinium parryi may approach  in maximum height. It has fuzzy stems and fuzzy, deeply lobed leaves.

The inflorescence holds a few to over 60 flowers on long pedicels. The sepals and petals are deep purple to light blue, with the upper petals often white. The spur may be over two centimeters long.

External links
Jepson Manual Treatment: Delphinium parryi
Delphinium parryi — U.C. Photo gallery

parryi
Flora of California
Flora of Baja California
Natural history of the California chaparral and woodlands
Natural history of the California Coast Ranges
Natural history of the Peninsular Ranges
Natural history of the San Francisco Bay Area
Natural history of the Santa Monica Mountains
Natural history of the Transverse Ranges
Flora without expected TNC conservation status